The 1070s BC is a decade which lasted from 1079 BC to 1070 BC.

Events and trends
 1079 BC—Death of Zhou cheng wang, King of the Zhou Dynasty of China.
 1078 BC—Zhou kang wang becomes King of the Zhou Dynasty of China.
 c. 1075 BC—New Kingdom ends in Ancient Egypt (Another date is 1200 BC).

Significant people
 Psusennes I, pharaoh of Egypt, is born (approximate date).
 Saul, king of Israel, is born (approximate date).

References